The 1919 Philadelphia mayoral election saw the election of J. Hampton Moore.

Results

References

1919
Philadelphia
1919 Pennsylvania elections
1910s in Philadelphia